New Generation Party is the name of political parties in several countries:

 New Generation Party (Romania)
 New Generation Party (Papua New Guinea)
 New Generation Party (Malaysia)
 New Generation Party (Costa Rica)